Miss Egypt is a national beauty pageant in Egypt.

Since 2016, Miss Egypt has been directed by Dr. Amaal Rezk.

History

Early years
The first Miss Egypt contest was held in 1927.  Charlotte Wassef won the competition in 1934 and was also crowned Miss Universe 1935 in Brussels. The only Miss Egypt winner that held the title of Miss World was Antigone Costanda, who was Miss Egypt 1954 and Miss World the same year.

Since 1986, the pageant has been sponsored by the hair care company Pantene. Many of the winners have found notable careers in television. It also introduced models and actresses such as Marina Papaelia.

2012–2013: Absence in pageantry
In its 2012 – 2013 edition the pageant was cancelled due to revolutionary conflicts in Egypt.

2014–2015: Face to Face Modelling Agency
In 2014, Miss Egypt returns after two years absence, organized by Miss Egypt Organization Face to face (modelling agency), Let's Take Care of the Planet (Dr. Amaal Rezk), the Egyptian Ministry of Tourism, and the Egyptian Tourism Authority.
On 27 of August, 2014, the first auditions were held at Sofitel Cairo El Gezirah Hotel, with 79 girls from across the country. The elimination took part over two rounds with 35 girls selected in round 1 and 20 final contestants are to enter the semi-finals (round 2), which was held at Citadel of Salah Ed-Din, then they participated in the qualifiers on the final round for the title of Miss Egypt 2014. The ceremony was held in Sharm el Sheikh on the 27 of September 2014. Lara Debbane was crowned Miss Egypt 2014, Amina Ashraf  was crowned Miss Egypt World 2014 and Nancy Magdy was crowned Miss Egypt Earth 2014.

International crowns
 One – International Pageant of Pulchritude 1935 winner: Charlotte Wassef (1935) 
 One – Miss World winner: Antigone Costanda (1954) 
 One – Best Model of the World winner: Arwa Gouda (2004)

Titleholders

Miss Egypt 1927-1965

Pantene Miss Egypt 1986-2010
The following is a list of winners. From 1986 to 2010, Pantene acquired the naming rights and the competition.

Miss Egypt 2014
In 2014 after 3 years absent, Miss Egypt manage the Top 3 into 3 major winners; Miss Egypt, Miss Egypt World and Miss Egypt Earth under Youssef Spahi directorship.

Miss Egypt Bent Masr
dr. Amaal Rezk took over the brand of Miss Egypt and rebranded as Miss Egypt Bent Masr. The winner sets to Miss Eco International.

Miss Egypt Universe
Former Miss Egypt 1968, Hoda Aboud took over the license of Miss Universe in 2017. The winner represents Egypt at the Miss Universe competition.

International pageants
The following women have represented Egypt in the Big Four international beauty pageants, the four major international beauty pageants for women. These are Miss World, Miss Universe, Miss International and Miss Earth.

Miss Egypt Universe

The Miss Egypt has started to send a Miss Egypt to Miss Universe from 1987. Miss Egypt 1986, Hoda Aboud was winning the first title of Miss Egypt after many years did not held in Egypt by Miss Egypt Organization. Began 2017 a brand new of Miss Egypt Universe organized by Hoda Aboud sends a national winning title to Miss Universe. On occasion, when the winner does not qualify (due to age) for either contest, a runner-up is sent.

Miss Egypt World

The 1st Runner-up at Miss Egypt between 1987 and 2014 went to Miss World and began in 2016 the franchise holder took over by Miss Egypt Bent Msr (operated by Dr. Amel Rizk). Egypt sends a delegate to Miss World since 1953 and now a delegate will be casting by Youssef Spahi (former president of Miss Egypt, Face of Face Agency) who last operated Miss Egypt in 2014.

Miss Egypt International

The Miss Egypt for Miss International awarded to former Miss Egypt winners or designation queens. Since the Miss International franchise in Egypt has rarely taken, the title has not extended since 2019. Last franchise holder was in 2018 by Hoda Aboud directorship.

Miss Egypt Earth

The Miss Egypt for Miss Earth awarded to former Miss Egypt winners or runners-up. Began 2018 the Miss Egypt Earth individual casting opened under Mustafa Elizali directorship.

See also

 List of beauty pageants

References

Recurring events established in 1927
Beauty pageants in Egypt
Egyptian awards
1927 establishments in Egypt
Egypt